The 1986 San Marino Grand Prix was a Formula One motor race held at Imola on 27 April 1986. The race was the third round of the year's World Championship. As with the previous year's event, fuel consumption was a big issue, changing the points finishers in the closing laps.

The Autodromo Dino Ferrari had received safety upgrades from the previous year, including slight track modifications after the Variante Alta chicane and extended runoff areas at the Rivazza complex.
 
Alain Prost (McLaren-TAG) dominated the race after Ayrton Senna (Lotus-Renault) and Nigel Mansell (Williams-Honda) retired early, before almost running out of fuel, three corners from the chequered flag. Frantically weaving the car back and forth to slosh the last drops of fuel into the pickup, he managed to keep it running just long enough to creep over the line and win the race (his McLaren team mate Keke Rosberg was classified 5th despite running dry 2 laps from the finish, a problem attributed to Rosberg using too much boost). Nelson Piquet brought his Williams home in second place only 7.645 seconds behind Prost, while Austrian Gerhard Berger finished third to score his and the Benetton team's first Formula One podium finish.

Classification

Qualifying

Race

Championship standings after the race

Drivers' Championship standings

Constructors' Championship standings

 Note: Only the top five positions are included for both sets of standings.

References

San Marino Grand Prix
San Marino Grand Prix
San Marino